Entopic may refer to:

A medical term meaning in the usual place, as opposed to ectopic
Entopic graphomania, a surrealistic technique involving automatic writing
Entoptic phenomenon, visual effects arising from within the eye, often misspelled entopic
Entopic, a Dutch company active in content marketing